Liangsan is a rural town in Xinhuang Dong Autonomous County, Hunan, China. The town is bordered to the north by Cengong County and Yuping Dong Autonomous County, to the east by Linchong Town and Fuluo Town, to the south by Pingdi Town of Tianzhu County, and to the west by Xuedong Town of Sansui County.

History
In the Tang dynasty, it was the capital of Huangzhou. In the Republic of China, the Liangsan Township was established and then renamed "Liangzhi Township". In 1953 it was upgraded to a town. In 1956 it was demoted as a township. In 2000 was upgraded to a town again. In October 2015, Dengzhai Township, Chaping Township and Huanglei Township were merged into the town.

Geography
The West River winds through the town.

The Liuping Reservoir is the largest body of water in the town.

There are a number of popular mountains located immediately adjacent to the townsite which include Mount Meiyanpo (Mount Gaolaopo and Mount Dengyun.

Economy
The local economy is primarily based upon agriculture and local industry. The main specialties include rape, corn, potatoes, umbrellas, umbrellas, tofu.

Attractions
The Bajiangkou Hot Spring is a famous scenic spot in the town.

References

Xinhuang